Bunnings Group Limited, trading as Bunnings Warehouse or Bunnings, is an Australian household hardware and garden centre chain. The chain has been owned by Wesfarmers since 1994, and has stores in Australia and New Zealand.

Bunnings was founded in Perth, Western Australia in 1886, by two brothers who had emigrated from England. Initially, a limited company focused on sawmilling, it became a public company in 1952 and subsequently expanded into the retail sector, purchasing several hardware stores. Bunnings began to expand into other states in the 1990s and opened its first warehouse-style store in Melbourne in 1994. As of 2022, the chain has 381 stores and over 53,000 employees.

Bunnings has a market share of around 50 percent in the Australian do it yourself (DIY) hardware market, with competing chains including Mitre 10, Home Hardware and various independent retailers such as Agora Marketplace and Total Tools around Australia.

Bunnings runs community events outside or in its stores, including sausage sizzles and do it yourself workshops.

Michael Scneider was appointed Managing Director, Bunnings Group in May 2017 following his appointment as Managing Director, Bunnings Australia & New Zealand in March 2016. Prior to this, he led the store operations teams across Bunnings Australia and New Zealand, after joining Bunnings in 2005.

History

Pre-Wesfarmers history

In 1886, brothers Arthur and Robert Bunning left London to settle in Perth, and soon gained a government building contract, which led to the founding of a group of building companies which later became Bunning Bros Pty Ltd. They purchased their first sawmill the following year in the south west of Western Australia, and over the next few years, they concentrated more on sawmilling and timber distribution and less on building.

The company expanded to include several new mills around Western Australia. In 1952, Bunnings became a public company, expanded into retailing and purchased several hardware stores. In 1970, Bunnings bought the merchandising and sawmilling operations of Hawker Siddeley. In 1983, it bought out Millars Timber & Trading Company and, in 1990, the Alco Handyman hardware operations. In 1993, Bunnings bought a company that operated Harry's and Lloyd's in South Australia, Campbell's in Queensland, and McEwans in Victoria and New South Wales. (This company had been spun off from Harris Scarfe in 1989). Many of the stores acquired were subsequently closed, with only the best-performing sites being retained.

1990s

Bunnings Limited was bought out by Wesfarmers in 1994. In late-1995, the 'Red Hammer' symbol was introduced and is still in use today. In June 1996, the company's trademark slogan "Lowest Prices Are Just The Beginning" was introduced. In February 2020, the company discontinued the use of the slogan.

After the acquisition, the first Bunnings Warehouse was opened in the Melbourne suburb of Sunshine by Victorian premier Jeff Kennett and Joe Boros, the managing director of Bunnings. This was quickly followed by three other Melbourne stores. Subsequently, new warehouses have been opened, on average, every three months across Australia. Development in Sydney and Brisbane proved more difficult than in other areas, as large blocks of land in the metropolitan area were limited.

In 1997, the remaining smaller-format McEwans stores were renamed Bunnings.

2000s

In August 2001, Wesfarmers bought the Howard Smith Group, including BBC Hardware (previously Nock & Kirby) and big-box offshoot Hardwarehouse. This supplemented the Bunnings national network by several dozen stores, many of them large Hardwarehouse stores in Sydney, Brisbane and New Zealand. Hardwarehouse had been dominant in New South Wales and Queensland, but the purchase complemented Bunnings' prior domination in Victoria, where Hardwarehouse had only seven stores to Bunnings' twenty at the time of the buy-out. At the time of purchase, the market leader was Mitre 10 with a 12% market share, but the inclusion of the Hardwarehouse and BBC Hardware stores brought Bunnings market share to 13.5%.

Hardwarehouse and BBC Hardware stores retained their branding for a year, while television advertisements were tagged with each of Bunnings Warehouse, Hardwarehouse and BBC Hardware during this transition period. Lower-volume stores were closed and, in 2002, the remaining Hardwarehouses were renamed Bunnings Warehouse.

The Howard Smith Group purchase also included Benchmark Building Supplies, a New Zealand chain of 32 stores, including nine Auckland stores. These were also closed or rebranded as Bunnings by 2003. Until then, Bunnings had just three New Zealand stores. By 2008, it had 14 large warehouse stores in the country.

From 2004 to 2008, Bunnings purchased and re-branded Mitre 10 stores in Griffith, Kempsey, Randwick and Wodonga, Magnet Mart in Griffith and a Mitre 10 Mega store in Modbury. In 2008 the Australian Competition & Consumer Commission (ACCC) looked into its acquisitions of five Mitre 10 stores, as it deemed the purchases would be anti-competitive. In February 2009, the ACCC allowed the purchases, finding that the acquisition of the Mitre 10 stores did not significantly alter the level of competition in the relevant market.

2010s

Over time, some smaller-format Bunnings stores have gradually been closed. However, six new stores were opened in Victoria in 2015, mainly in smaller regional markets and inner-suburban areas.

2020s

In mid-May 2020, Bunnings announced it would close seven stores in New Zealand in Ashburton, Hornby, Hastings, Cambridge, Rangiora, Te Awamutu, and Putāruru with the loss of 145 jobs as a result of the global COVID-19 pandemic. This left Bunnings with 41 New Zealand stores, including 12 in Auckland.

In Australia, Bunnings unsuccessfully lobbied the Victorian state government to exempt its 168 stores from closure during the second Melbourne lockdown. However the company was allowed to continue fulfilling online orders, and subsequently its online business expanded and grew due to continuing demand despite various periods of restrictions around the country.

In 2021 the ACCC ruled that the purchase of Beaumont Tiles outlets would not reduce competition as Bunnings was not currently in the field in a big way. Bunnings has said it will continue to run Beaumont Tiles the way it has been and with the same management team.

In November 2021, both Bunnings and Officeworks partnered with the Flybuys Loyalty program to allow customers to collect points at both stores.

Operations

Since the development of the Bunnings Warehouse stores, three general operational formats exist Bunnings Small-format Store (SFS), Bunnings Warehouse (WH) and Bunnings Trade Centre (TC). The smaller "Bunnings" stores stock a more limited range of hardware, whereas the larger "Bunnings Warehouses" contain a more comprehensive hardware range and garden supplies, including plants. The big box format accounts for 167 stores of the network of 280.

Bunnings Warehouse offers a variety of additional services, both in-home and in-store. The in-home services are mainly installations, assembling, quotes and consultancy for multiple products. The in-store services include a hire shop, spare parts enquiry, colour matching, key cutting, pool water testing and gas swapping.

Bunnings also provides gardening, craft, and woodwork do it yourself (DIY) workshops for children in-store, as well as for other groups in schools, nursing homes, and hospitals. The Bunnings staff are available to community groups for assistance with DIY projects.

Sausage sizzles

On weekends (and weekdays at some sites), Bunnings outlets regularly host sausage sizzles and cake stalls for community groups and causes. It has become an intrinsic part of the Bunnings Warehouse brand, and iconic in Australian culture.

In 2018, chief operating officer Debbie Poole sparked a public debate when she suggested "onion be placed underneath sausages to help prevent the onion from falling out and creating a slipping hazard”. She insisted it would not "impact the delicious taste or great feeling you get when supporting your local community group".

Finances 
Bunnings reported AU$16.871 billion in revenue for the fiscal year 2020–2021, which was a 12.5% revenue growth from the 2019–2020 fiscal year, where Bunnings reported AU$14.999 billion in revenue.

UK and Ireland

In February 2016, Bunnings' parent company Wesfarmers bought the United Kingdom-based hardware chain Homebase for £340 million. The chain's 265 stores in the UK and 15 in Ireland were intended to be rebranded with the Bunnings name within five years. The first Bunnings store in the UK was opened at the end of January 2017 in St Albans, four months later than planned to ensure the adopted format was suited to the UK public. The company planned to use that store as a test model prior to fine-tuning and expanding in that region. In April 2017, they bought a former B&Q store in Folkestone to be the fifth Bunnings store in the UK.

On 25 May 2018, after mounting losses, Wesfarmers sold the UK and Ireland Bunnings/Homebase operation to Hilco for a nominal sum of £1. The 24 stores already rebranded as Bunnings reverted to the Homebase name, with some later closing under an agreed company voluntary arrangement. The failure of Bunnings in the UK and Ireland has been called "the most disastrous retail acquisition in the UK ever".

House brands
House brands of Bunnings include:

 Click: Electrical fittings and accessories (Australian and New Zealand)
 Matador: Barbecues and accessories
 Saxon: Gardening and landscaping products
 Eiger Electrical: Electrical fittings and accessories (UK and Ireland)

See also
 Charles Bunning, played an early role in the development of Bunnings

References

External links
 Bunnings Warehouse home page
 Bunnings Warehouse NZ home page
 Bunnings Warehouse UK home page
 Bunnings Trade home page
 Bunnings Property Trust home page

Hawker Siddeley
Home improvement companies of Australia
Home improvement companies of New Zealand
Retail companies established in 1952
Wesfarmers
Australian companies established in 1952
1886 establishments in Australia
Companies based in Melbourne